United Nations Security Council Resolution 1863, adopted unanimously on January 16, 2009, after recalling resolutions 733 (1992), 751 (1992), 1356 (2001), 1425 (2002), 1519 (2003), 1725 (2006), 1744 (2007), 1772 (2007), 1801 (2008), 1811 (2008), 1814 (2008), 1831 (2008) and 1844 (2008) on the situation in Somalia, the Council its intention to establish a peace-keeping force in war-torn Somalia and called on Secretary-General Ban Ki-moon to develop, by April 15, 2009, a mandate for the proposed mission, which would replace the existing African Union force in the country (AMISOM).

Resolution

United Nations Peace Keeping force to Somalia
The resolution stated that the Security Council would further review the actual deployment of peace keeping force to Somalia on June 1, 2009.  In the meantime, the Secretary General would compile a report that would include developments in Somalia, progress towards full deployment of the existing 3,200-strong African Union force in Somalia and progress in the political process and security conditions on the ground. The Council called on the Secretary-General to also include in his report a mandate for the force, whose tasks would be to assist the delivery of Humanitarian aid to Somali civilians, protect government officials and buildings and as well as United Nations staff, to monitor the implementation of the Djibouti Peace Agreement and any subsequent cease fires and to build up Somalia's security forces.

Support of AMISOM
Welcoming AMISOM's contribution to lasting peace and stability in Somalia, the Security Council, acting under Chapter VII of the United Nations Charter, renewed the African Union's mission in Somalia for another six months and authorized AMISOM to take all necessary measures to protect key infrastructure in Somalia, as well as to create the appropriate security conditions for the delivery of humanitarian aid. It also requested that the African Union maintain AMISOM's deployment and reinforce the original 8,000-troop deployment in order to enhance the mission's capability to carry out its mandate and to protect key installations around the capital, Mogadishu.

The Security Council also called on the Secretary-General to establish a Trust Fund for African Union forces in the country until United Nations peace-keeping troops could arrive to assist in training Somali security forces. The Council also asked the Secretary-General to hold a donors' conference as soon as possible to gather contributions to the trust fund and also called on the African Union to consult with the Secretary-General and submit budgetary requests to the fund. In response to a recommendation from the Secretary General, the Council approved the enhancement of AMISOM by transferring assets after the liquidation of the United Nations Mission in Ethiopia and Eritrea (UNMEE).

In order for AMISOM's forces to be incorporated into the proposed United Nations peacekeeping operation, the Security Council requested the Secretary-General provide a United Nations logistical support package to AMISOM, including equipment and services, until June 1, 2009, or until the Council reached a decision on establishing a United Nations force.

Response

Statements by Security Council members

See also
 List of United Nations Security Council Resolutions 1801 to 1900 (2008–2009)
 Somali Civil War

References

External links
Text of the Resolution at undocs.org

 1863
 1863
2009 in Somalia
January 2009 events